Club Los Cedros is an Argentine sports club based in the Los Polvorines district of Greater Buenos Aires. Although other activities are hosted by the club, Los Cedros is mostly known for its rugby union team, which currently plays in the Segunda Superior, the fifth division of the Unión de Rugby de Buenos Aires league system.

Apart from rugby, other sports practised at Los Cedros are field hockey, football, and tennis.

History 
Current club's facilities were part of a great cattle ranch owned by Admiral Sixto Barilar, known as "Villa Barilari". When his widow died, the ranch was expropriated by the government and then sold, being acquired by the Argentine Rugby Union in the 1960s. The purpose of the purchase was to build a great rugby union stadium, although the idea was later dismissed, therefore it was the club which finally purchased the ranch.

References

External links
 
 Ascenso de Los Cedros (Rugby) en 1983

C
C
C
c
1975 establishments in Argentina